Interstellar Express or Interstellar Heliosphere Probe, is the current name for a proposed Chinese National Space Administration program designed to explore the heliosphere and interstellar space. The program will feature two space probes that will purportedly be launched in 2024 and follow differing trajectories to encounter Jupiter to assist them out of the Solar System. The first probe, IHP-1, will travel toward the nose of the heliosphere, while the second probe, IHP-2, will fly near to the tail, skimming by Neptune and Triton in January 2038. There may be another probe—tentatively IHP-3—which would launch in 2030 to explore to the northern half of the heliosphere. IHP-1 and IHP-2 would be the sixth and seventh spacecraft to leave the Solar System, as well as first non-NASA probes to achieve this status.

History 
The heliosphere and the interstellar medium have so far been explored by only three NASA probes: Voyager 1, Voyager 2, and New Horizons. Both Voyagers used gravity assists to take them out of the plane of the ecliptic: Voyager 1 to the north with Saturn in 1980, and Voyager 2 to the south with Neptune in 1989; New Horizons designed to stay within the plane to allow for exploration of other Kuiper belt objects. However, none of these probes are exploring the tail of the heliosphere; Pioneer 10, which was headed toward the tail after its Jupiter flyby in 1973, lost contact with Earth in 2003. Later spacecraft which would remain within the Solar System, such as Cassini–Huygens, have gathered valuable data on the heliosphere and how it interacts with the interstellar medium, suggesting that the heliosphere is not shaped like a comet but is rather spherical.

Overview 
Each probe is to weigh about 200 kilograms, to use radioisotope thermoelectric generators for power, and to carry 50 kilograms or more of scientific instruments such as optical cameras, magnetometers, dust detectors, and neutral atom and particle payloads. They will also study anomalous cosmic rays, interplanetary dust, and the interstellar medium. Depending on whether monopropellant or ion propulsion is used, the probes would be launched using either Long March 3B or Long March 5 rockets. While IHP-1 and IHP-2 will use RTGs for power, IHP-3, if approved, would use a nuclear reactor.

50000 Quaoar and its moon Weywot are currently being considered as potential flyby targets for IHP-1. Centaur exploration has also been considered for both probes.

While a 2024 launch date was targeted, the COVID-19 pandemic has caused some delays, which may render it to launch at a later date. Future dates of May 2025 and 2026 launches have already been considered for IHP-2, and it is possible that IHP-1 could be moved to those as well.

Scientific payload 

The probes are proposed to carry the following suite of instruments:

Trajectory 

The goal of the spacecraft is to have travelled a total of 100 astronomical units by 2049, which is the centennial celebration of the People's Republic of China's founding.

IHP-1 will launch in May 2024. In October 2025 it will return to Earth for a gravity assist, then loop back in December 2027 for yet another gravity assist. In March 2029 the probe will fly by Jupiter to send it on a trajectory toward the nose of the heliosphere and potentially make observations of centaurs or Kuiper belt objects, including the flyby of Quaoar, along the way. By 2049 the probe will be 85 AU away from the Sun.

IHP-2 will launch between May 2024 and May 2026, but it will likewise receive two gravity assists from Earth in May 2027 and March 2032 respectively. The flyby of Jupiter in May 2033 will send it on a path to fly by Neptune in January 2038 at only 1,000 kilometers above its cloud tops. The probe may also release an atmospheric impactor prior to the flyby. After the flybys, the probe will visit a Kuiper belt object, and by 2049 the probe will have traveled 83 AU away from the Sun, heading toward the yet-unexplored tail of the heliosphere.

If launched with Tianwen-4, there may be very well a chance for comparative planetology in some form. After IHP-2's flyby of Neptune and Triton is performed in 2038, Tianwen-4's Uranus flyby and probe would occur in 2039, and IHP-1'''s Quaoar flyby would occur in 2040, allowing for comparisons of similar planetary cohorts within a short span of only a few years.

 Flyby targets 

 IHP-1 

 IHP-2 

 See also 

 Tianwen-4, a Chinese Jupiter orbiter to launch in 2029 that may include a component to fly by Uranus.
 Interstellar Probe, a concept by NASA to explore the heliosphere to be launched sometime in the 2030s.
 Voyager 1 and 2, probes by NASA designed to explore the outer planets that have since passed the boundary between the heliosphere and interstellar space.
 Trident, a concept by NASA to explore Neptune and Triton, which would have been launched in 2025 on a trajectory to reach Triton in mid-2038.
 Neptune Odyssey'', a concept by NASA designed to orbit Neptune and Triton that may carry an atmospheric probe as part of its cargo.

References

External links 

Chinese space probes
Proposed space probes
Missions to Jupiter
Missions to Neptune
Missions to minor planets